M/F Tycho Brahe is a Danish battery-electric car-ferry owned by ForSea Ferries that operates on the HH Ferry route. It has been in use since 1991. The ship is bidirectional, which means it can change direction without turning around, so no time is lost for this. The ship is also able to accelerate and decelerate quite quickly to and from her maximum speed of 14 knots.

The ship is named after the Danish astronomer Tycho Brahe. M/F Tycho Brahe was built by Langsten Slip & Båtbyggeri in Tomrefjord, Norway. Currently, the ship is owned by Scandlines A/S and operated by ForSea (previously Scandlines GmbH). Between 1991 and 1997, M/F Tycho Brahe was owned by DSB Rederi.

The ferry can carry 1250 passengers, and either 260 trucks, 240 cars or 9 passenger train coaches at one time. It was built with three railtracks inside, with a total length of 266 meters.

Conversion to electric
M/F Tycho Brahe has a sister ship, M/S Aurora af Helsingborg. The two ships were originally diesel-powered, but were converted in 2017 to full electric propulsion. Each ship has a 4 MWh battery, weighing 57 metric tonnes, located at the top of the ferry between the chimneys. The batteries are recharged from land by a robot arm when docked, at 10.5 MW (10.5 kV, 600 A) for 6 minutes in Denmark and 9 minutes in Sweden. Each trip uses about 1,175 kWh and is scheduled to last 20 minutes similarly to the diesel ferries. Two of the four Wärtsilä-Vasa 6R32E diesel engines have been removed from each ship, with the other two as a backup system, not for daily operation.

Main specifications:

 Length: 111 m/364 ft 2 in
 Beam: 28,2 m/92 ft 6 in
 Draft: 5,7 m/18 ft 8 in
 Tonnage: 12000 gt
 Machinery: 4 thrusters of 1.5 MW each, 4.1 MWh Li-ion batteries.  Backup system: two-shaft, diesel, 3350 hp

Gallery

References

 The Encyclopedia of ships. General editor: Tony Gibbons. Silverdale books, 2002, . Page 216.

External links
M/F Tycho Brahe
Forsea ferries
Fully charged show on electric ferries
Electrek: Two massive ferries are about to become the biggest all-electric ships in the world 

Ferries of Sweden
Ferries of Denmark
1991 ships